Becnel is a surname. Notable people with the surname include:

Barbara Becnel (born 1950), American author, journalist, and film producer
Rexanne Becnel, American romance novelist

See also
Becel

English-language surnames